An intense outbreak produced 16 destructive tornadoes across the Mississippi Valley on March 26-27, 1950. A total of 12 significant (F2+) tornadoes touched down, including three that hit Little Rock, Arkansas and Jackson, Mississippi. Overall, there was one fatality, 52 injuries, and $1.883 million in damage from the outbreak. Two additional deaths occurred due to severe thunderstorm winds as well.

Meteorological synopsis
A low-pressure that had formed in Colorado on March 25 moved eastward and then moved slowly northeastward into Great Lakes region. A cold front extending back through the already favorable conditions in the Mississippi Valley sparked multiple severe and tornadic thunderstorms that moved generally eastward.

Confirmed tornadoes

Note: The Climatological Data National Summary and/or Thomas P. Grazulis reported some additional tornadoes that were not counted toward the final total:
March 26
A tornado moved directly through Ellsinore, Missouri, damaging homes in the town.
March 27
An F2 tornado destroyed tenant homes and barns just north of Manila, Arkansas. A related tornado may have also injured two people at Joiner.

March 26 event

March 27 event

Meadowcliff–Little Rock–North Little Rock–Booker, Arkansas

This strong F2 tornado first touched down on the southwest side of Little Rock in Meadowcliff and passed through Geyer Springs. A drive-in theater screen was damaged and two cars in the theater lot were overturned, injuring five people. The tornado then progressed northeastward and struck the residential district, causing considerable damage to roofs before striking the business district of Downtown Little Rock. There was extensive damage to roofs, windows, plate glass, signs, and brick and masonry parapets. A large radio antenna mast toppled from roof of the Gazette Building. The tornado then crossed the Arkansas River into North Little Rock, where it did considerable damage to roofs, trees and signs, and injured two more people. The tornado weakened after that, causing slight crop damage before dissipating west of Booker.

Seven people were injured and losses totaled $250,000. Considerable water damage by rain entering buildings through torn roofs and broken windows also occurred as a result of this tornado. Some small hail was also observed as well.

Non-tornadic impacts
Severe thunderstorms impacted Missouri, Indiana, Illinois, and Southern Wisconsin, causing widespread hail, wind, and lightning damage and killing livestock. In Kansas City, Missouri, two boys were killed when they were crushed to death by a falling tree. On March 27, severe thunderstorms struck the Southeast and two people were injured in wind damage instances of Concordia Parish, Louisiana. In Iberia Parish, the winds downed power lines and injured two people. A fatality also occurred when a person was electrocuted by a high voltage wire.

High winds blew soil and light snow across north-central and eastern Colorado between March 25–26, damaging small buildings and grain. Transportation was slowed or halted due to reduced visibility, especially across mountain passes, and multiple car accidents led to the death of one person as well as injuries of three others. Moderate temperatures of around 30°F at the start of the event on March 25 also led to a cold rain falling in some areas and Fargo saw its heaviest 24-hour rainfall amount ever recorded in March. Many stations across state also recorded record snowfall accumulations for March as well. Transportation stalled and numerous cars stalled in the heavy, wet snow with people taking refuge in them or even on stranger's farms. Some cattle was lost and feed stocks were isolated on some farms. One person died near Devils Lake due to heart failure while another person died attempting to look for help after his car stalled near Streeter. Temperatures across the state eventually bottomed out near 0°F on March 28 after the storm ended the day prior.

Highways were closed in numerous areas and there was crop and minor roof and property damage. Reduced visibilities led to vehicle accidents that killed five and injure many others.

See also
 List of North American tornadoes and tornado outbreaks

Notes

References

Tornadoes of 1950
F3 tornadoes
1950 in Arkansas
1950 in Oklahoma
1950 in Mississippi
1950 in Louisiana
1950 in Tennessee
1950 in Illinois
Tornadoes in Arkansas
Tornadoes in Oklahoma
Tornadoes in Mississippi
Tornadoes in Louisiana
Tornadoes in Tennessee
Tornadoes in Illinois